Josef Obajdin (born 7 November 1970) is a Czech former professional footballer striker. The best years of his career he spent in Sparta Prague where he was many times a champion of the Czech Republic. Obajdin played once for the Czech Republic national football team.

Career
Obajdin was born in Poděbrady. Until age of 15, he played for the youth team of his city's team, TJ SB Poděbrady. Then he continued to play in 1984 for Sparta Prague youth team. From 1989 until 1991, he was a member of the senior squad of VTJ Tábor. During the 1991–92 season, he played for Škoda Pilsen, however in the middle of the season he was transferred to Dukla Prague, for which he played his five first league matches. The following season, he began playing for SK Poldi Kladno in the Czech 2. Liga, however he was transferred soon to Slovan Liberec, and helped them to promotion to the Czech Liga.

In Liberec, he performed well, scoring 11 goals in 28 matches in 1993–94  and 10 goals in 14 matches in 1994–95. This caused the interest of Eintracht Frankfurt and they signed him at the middle of the 1994–95 season. In the Bundesliga he played only three games due to injury problems. He returned again to play for his previous team, Slovan Liberec, for the first half year of the 1995–96 season and transferred in January 1996 to Sparta Prague.

There, Obajdin remained five years and scored 26 goals in 146 games and winning five consecutive times the Czech Championship. Although he was in a good form, he was reserve during the 2001–02 season with the new trainer Jaroslav and changed team in January 2002 by being transferred to the Cypriot team Omonia Nicosia, where he played for the rest of the season without success. After half a year, Obajdin went back to Prague, to play for his previous team, but did not manage to secure a place in the squad and was loaned to Bohemians Prague where he did not score in ten games. Back in Sparta, he was used only in the second-class B-team.

When Obajdin's contract ran out for Sparta in 2004, the nearly 34-year-old player was in the meantime without club. He was free agent for half a year, but signed for Slovan Varnsdorf in spring 2005. At the beginning of 2006, he signed for the Polish team Wisła Płock, where he played until January 2007, when he was released. He returned to Varnsdorf a few months later.

References

External links
 
 

1970 births
Living people
People from Poděbrady
Association football forwards
Czech footballers
Czech Republic international footballers
Dukla Prague footballers
AC Omonia players
AC Sparta Prague players
FC Slovan Liberec players
SK Kladno players
Wisła Płock players
Eintracht Frankfurt players
Bundesliga players
Czech First League players
Cypriot First Division players
Ekstraklasa players
Expatriate footballers in Germany
Expatriate footballers in Cyprus
Expatriate footballers in Poland
Czech expatriate footballers
Czech expatriate sportspeople in Poland
Sportspeople from the Central Bohemian Region